Crocidomera turbidella is a species of snout moth in the genus Crocidomera. It was described by Zeller in 1848. It is found in Cuba, Jamaica and Mexico.

References

Moths described in 1848
Phycitinae